The San Marino national amateur football team represents San Marino in the UEFA Regions' Cup and it is controlled by the San Marino Football Federation (FSGC). The team represents the smallest population of any UEFA member.

Competitive record

UEFA Regions' Cup

Matches

External links
San Marino Football Federation: National Amateur Team San Marino

Sports organizations established in 1999
European national amateur association football teams
Amateur